Stylodrilus is a genus of Lumbriculidae.

The genus was described in 1861 by René-Édouard Claparède.

It has cosmopolitan distribution.

Species:
 Stylodrilus asiaticus
 Stylodrilus heringianus

References

Lumbriculidae